Phylloxiphia goodii is a moth of the family Sphingidae. It is known from Sierra Leone, Liberia, Cameroon, the Central African Republic, Gabon, the Democratic Republic of the Congo and the Republic of the Congo.

References

Phylloxiphia
Moths described in 1889
Moths of Africa